"Dance, Dance, Dance (Yowsah, Yowsah, Yowsah)" is a song by American R&B band Chic. It was the group's first single and hit in the United States, reaching number 6 on both the pop and R&B charts.  In addition, along with the tracks "You Can Get By" and "Everybody Dance", the single reached number one on the disco charts. Luther Vandross provided backup vocals. He was working as a session vocalist at the time.

The "yowsah, yowsah, yowsah" part of the title, which appears as a spoken interjection in the middle of the song, originated with the American jazz violinist and radio personality Ben Bernie, who popularized it in the 1920s. The phrase was revived in 1969 by They Shoot Horses, Don't They?, a film about a Depression-era dance marathon.

According to co-writer Nile Rodgers,

Reception
Record World called it "pure disco with something extra." Oakland Tribune critic Larry Kelp called it "one of the worst records of the year."

Track listing and formats

Buddah 7" BDA 583, 1977 / Atlantic 7" 3435, September 30, 1977
A. "Dance, Dance, Dance (Yowsah, Yowsah, Yowsah)"  (7" Edit) - 3:41
B. "São Paulo"  - 5:01

Buddah 12" DSC 121, 1977 / Atlantic 12" DK 4600, 1977
A. "Dance, Dance, Dance (Yowsah, Yowsah, Yowsah)" - 8:21
B. "São Paulo" - 5:01

Atlantic 12" promo DSKO 101, 1977
A. "Dance, Dance, Dance (Yowsah, Yowsah, Yowsah)" - 8:21
B. "Dance, Dance, Dance (Yowsah, Yowsah, Yowsah)"  (7" Edit) - 3:41

Atlantic 12" DK 4621, 1978
A. "Dance, Dance, Dance (Yowsah, Yowsah, Yowsah)"  - 8:21
B. "Everybody Dance" (12" Mix) - 8:25

Charts

References

External links
 [ Song Review] from AllMusic

1977 debut singles
Chic (band) songs
Disco songs
Songs written by Bernard Edwards
Songs written by Nile Rodgers
Song recordings produced by Nile Rodgers
Song recordings produced by Bernard Edwards
1977 songs
Atlantic Records singles